
Year 648 (DCXLVIII) was a leap year starting on Tuesday (link will display the full calendar) of the Julian calendar. The denomination 648 for this year has been used since the early medieval period, when the Anno Domini calendar era became the prevalent method in Europe for naming years.

Events 
 By place 

 Byzantine Empire 
 Emperor Constans II issues an imperial edict forbidding Monothelitism to be discussed, to quiet the intense controversy caused by the Monothelete doctrine. This edict, distributed by patriarch Paul II in Constans' name, is known as the Typos.

 Europe 
 King Sigebert II of Austrasia is advised by Remaclus to establish a double-monastery, at Stavelot and Malmedy. As a missionary bishop, he founds an abbey on the River Amblève (modern Belgium).

 Britain 
 King Cenwalh of Wessex returns from a 3-year exile in East Anglia, to reclaim his kingdom. He gives 3,000 hides of land around Ashdown to his nephew Cuthred, possibly sub-king of Berkshire (England). 
 Cenwahl invites bishop Birinus to establish under his direction the Old Minster in Winchester. Together they have a small stone church built.

 Asia 
 Tang general Ashina She'er re-establishes Tang control of Karasahr, and leads a military campaign against the Tarim Basin kingdom of Kucha in Xinjiang, a vassal of the Western Turkic Khaganate.

 Americas 
 In an early skirmish in the run up to the Second Tikal-Calakmul War, B'alaj Chan K'awiil scores a military victory, apparently over his half-brother, who had galled him by using the same royal emblem (or emblem glyph) as he did.
 Dos Pilas breaks away from Tikal and becomes a vassal state of Calakmul.

 By topic 

 Literature 
 The Book of Jin is compiled in China during the Tang Dynasty. Its chief editor is the chancellor Fang Xuanling, who dies in this year as well.

 Religion 
 Pope Theodore I excommunicates Paul II of Constantinople.

Births 
 Kōbun, emperor of Japan (d. 672)
 Redbad, king of Frisia (d. 719)
 Tōchi, Japanese princess (d. 678)

Deaths 
 Fang Xuanling, chancellor of the Tang Dynasty (b. 579)
 John III of the Sedre, Syriac Orthodox Patriarch of Antioch.
 Ma Zhou, chancellor of the Tang Dynasty (b. 601)
 Xiao, empress of the Sui Dynasty

References

Sources